Long Lake is a large lake in the Lower Peninsula of the U.S. state of Michigan. Its maximum depth of  makes it the fifth-deepest lake in Grand Traverse County. Long Lake is home to the largest nesting population of loons in the Lower Peninsula.

Long Lake is primarily within the eponymous Long Lake Township, although a small portion extends south into Green Lake Township. The lake is the primary source of the Platte River, which flows west through Benzie County to Lake Michigan.

Geography 
Long Lake is located in Northern Michigan, in northwestern Grand Traverse County. It is mainly situated within Long Lake Township, of which it has lent its name, although a small portion of the southern end of the lake lies within Green Lake Township.

Long Lake is primary headwaters of the Platte River, which flows westward from the lake, warming as it flows to Lake Michigan in neighboring Benzie County.

The Carter-Strong Bird Sanctuary is a protection area at the southwestern end of the lake.

Recreation 
Long Lake is well-known in the area for being a popular recreation lake.

There are three public parks on the shores of the lake:
 Taylor Park
 Gilbert Park
 Crescent Shores Park & Boat Launch
Many homeowners on the lake also own boats. Boaters on the lake choose to swim, water ski, and fish. Many varieties of fish live in the lake, but fishers tend to find bluegill, largemouth bass, muskellunge, northern pike, rock bass, smallmouth bass, sunfish, walleye and yellow perch.

Islands 
Below is a list of the islands in Long Lake:
 Picnic Island (formerly Covell Island)
 Long Island
 Fox Island
 South Island
 Brush Island
Fox and South Islands are the site of local Boy Scouts camps. These islands are also owned by the Grand Traverse Regional Land Conservancy.

See also
List of lakes in Michigan

References

External links
 Map of Long Lake
 The Long Lake Peninsula Association, A Private Community
 Long Lake Township
Lakes of Michigan
Lakes of Grand Traverse County, Michigan